The South Financial Group, originally known as Carolina First Corporation, was a bank holding company headquartered in Greenville, South Carolina.  The South Financial Group was the parent company of Carolina First, with branch locations in North and South Carolina and Mercantile Bank, with branch locations in Florida.

The South Financial Group began posting heavy losses in 2008 and lost more than $1.7 billion before its sale in 2010 to TD Bank Financial Group of Toronto, Ontario, Canada. It lost more than $735 million alone during 2009, and another $400 million through the first six months of 2010. In May 2010, pending shareholder and regulatory approvals, it was announced that TD Bank, N.A., which is co-headquartered in Cherry Hill, New Jersey, and Portland, Maine, planned to acquire the troubled company. TD Bank is a subsidiary of Toronto-Dominion Bank based in Toronto, Ontario, Canada. A lawsuit was filed by a group of company shareholders against The South Financial Group, its board of directors and TD Bank in conjunction with the proposed sale. The suit was ultimately settled, clearing the way for the sale.

Between 2007 and 2010, South Financial's stock fell from more than $25 a share to less than $1 during this tumultuous period. Over its last five-plus years, South Financial saw its stock lose 99 percent of its value.
In December 2008, South Financial received $347 million from the federal government as part of Troubled Asset Relief Program. At the end of April 2010, Carolina First entered into a consent order with the Federal Deposit Insurance Corporation (FDIC) and the Federal Reserve Bank of Richmond that sets time frames during which the bank must improve its capital position or risk being taken over by federal regulators. As part of the deal for South Financial the U.S. Treasury received $131 million.

On Sept, 28, 2010, The South Financial Group shareholders approved the merger of the company with TD Bank Financial Group. As of October 1, 2010 Carolina First and Mercantile Bank now operate as trade names of TD Bank, N.A.  Both Mercantile Bank and Carolina First will be renamed TD Bank in mid-2011 after planned system integrations. Until such time both banks names will remain unchanged and be advertised in all markets as being "trade names of TD Bank, N.A."

History 

 1986 – began as the Carolina First Bank
 1994 – acquired Citadel Federal Savings Bank of Charleston, South Carolina
 1995 – acquired Carolina First Savings Bank F.S.B. of Georgetown, South Carolina, Aiken County National Bank of Aiken, South Carolina, and Midlands National Bank of Prosperity, South Carolina
 1999 – acquired Citizens Bank, NA of Shawano, Wisconsin
 1997 – acquired Lowcountry Savings Bank of Mount Pleasant, South Carolina and First Federal Savings and Loan of Anderson, South Carolina
 1998 – acquired First National Bank of Pickens County of Easley, South Carolina and Colonial Bank of South Carolina of Camden, South Carolina
 2000 – acquired The Anchor Bank of Myrtle Beach, South Carolina and Carolina First Bank of Travelers Rest, South Carolina
 2002 – acquired Rock Hill Bank & Trust of Rock Hill, South Carolina
 2003 – acquired MountainBank of Hendersonville, North Carolina
 2008 – acquired 5 branches of BankAtlantic of Orlando, Florida
 2010 – The South Financial Group acquired by TD Bank Financial Group
 2011 - TD Bank Financial Group plans to integrate all systems and change bank names of Carolina First & Mercantile Bank to TD Bank on June 13, 2011.

Subsidiaries 
The South Financial Group operated three wholly owned subsidiaries: Mercantile Bank of Florida, Carolina First in North Carolina and South Carolina, and Bank CaroLine, an Internet bank. All three brands functioned as 
subsidiaries of Carolina First, which had approximately $12 billion in assets.

See also 

 Mercantile Bank (disambiguation)
 TD Banknorth
 Toronto-Dominion Bank

References

External links 
 The South Financial Group website
 Carolina First website
 Mercantile Bank website
 Bank CaroLine website
 TD Bank website

Toronto-Dominion Bank
Companies based in Greenville, South Carolina
Banks based in South Carolina
Economy of the Southeastern United States
American companies established in 1986
Banks established in 1986
1986 establishments in South Carolina
Defunct banks of the United States